The Rush of Green, also known as Pan or The Bowater House Group, was the last sculpture completed by Jacob Epstein before his death at his home in Hyde Park Gate on 19 August 1959. The sculpture group includes a long-limbed family – father, mother, son and dog – rushing towards Hyde Park, encouraged by the Greek god Pan playing his pipes. It was cast in bronze posthumously and installed in 1961 on a plinth separating the carriageways of Edinburgh Gate beneath Bowater House. The sculpture was removed when Bowater House was demolished in 2006 and reinstalled near the building which replaced it, One Hyde Park, in 2010.  The sculpture was granted a Grade II listing in January 2016.

The sculpture was commissioned by Harold Samuel in November 1957. He was the chairman of the Land Securities Investment Trust, and intended the statue to be sited beside the company's new office development at Bowater House, on the southern edge of Hyde Park. It was cast in bronze by Morris Singer and installed in April 1961 in the middle of Edinburgh Gate, a road that ran from Knightsbridge underneath the newly built Bowater House to South Carriage Drive. A maquette of the sculpture was exhibited in the foyer of the building.

The sculpture was removed when Bowater House was demolished in 2006 to be replaced by One Hyde Park and reinstalled in 2010 at the entrance to the relocated Edinburgh Gate, some distance to the west, still beside South Carriage Road, accompanied by new  bronze gates designed by Wendy Ramshaw.

See also
 1959 in art
 Greek mythology in western art and literature
 List of public art in Knightsbridge

References

 Pan Statue, Royal Parks
 One Hyde Park, Davison Arts Partnership
 Edinburgh Gate SW1, 28 February 2013 
 London’s Epstein Sculptures: Part 7: Hyde Park, Spike Magazine, 12 January 2012 
 The Pan Statue, Historic England

  

1959 sculptures
Bronze sculptures in the United Kingdom
Sculptures of dogs in the United Kingdom
Ancient Greece in art and culture
Sculptures by Jacob Epstein
Outdoor sculptures in London
Sculptures of Pan (god)
Sculptures of men in the United Kingdom
Sculptures of women in the United Kingdom
Sculptures of classical mythology
Grade II listed buildings in the City of Westminster
Sculptures of children in the United Kingdom
Musical instruments in art
Relocated buildings and structures in the United Kingdom